The Zagaran Pass (el. 16,420 ft.) is a high mountain pass that connects Yarkhun River valley in Chitral District to the Gupis valley in Gilgit-Baltistan.

The pass is about 3 miles southwest from Bahushtar Zom peak (5704 m) and about 5 miles east-southeast from Malo Zom peak (5652 m). The border between Chitral and Northern Areas runs through the pass. The top of the pass is on the rapidly retreating glacier. 5 miles to the east of the pass is the valley of Bakhushtaro river that flows southeast for 12 miles up to its confluence with Ghizar river some 6 miles west of village Pinal. To the west of the pass is an unnamed westward directed valley that after 15 miles ends at Yarkhun river some 5 miles northeast of town Mastuj.

Mountain passes of Gilgit-Baltistan
Chitral District
Gupis-Yasin District